The Ahom, or Tai-Ahom is an ethnic group from the Indian states of Assam and Arunachal Pradesh. The members of this group are admixed descendants of the Tai people who reached the Brahmaputra valley of Assam in 1228 and the local indigenous people who joined them over the course of history. Sukaphaa, the leader of the Tai group and his 9000 followers established the Ahom kingdom (1228–1826 CE), which controlled much of the Brahmaputra Valley in modern Assam until 1826.

The modern Ahom people and their culture are a syncretism of the original Tai and their culture and local Tibeto-Burman people and their cultures they absorbed in Assam. The local people of different ethnic groups of Assam that took to the Tai way of life and polity were incorporated into their fold which came to be known as Ahom as in the process known as Ahomisation. Many local ethnic groups, including the Borahis who were of Tibeto-Burman origin, were completely subsumed into the Ahom community; while members of other communities, based on their allegiance to the Ahom kingdom or the usefulness of their talents, too were accepted as Ahoms. Currently, they represent the largest Tai group in India, with a population of nearly 4.6 million in Assam. Ahom people are found mostly in Upper Assam in the districts of Golaghat, Jorhat, Sibsagar,Choraideu, Dibrugarh, Tinsukia (south of Brahmaputra river); and in Lakhimpur, Sonitpur,Bishwanath,and Dhemaji (north). N some area of Nagaon,Guwahati

Even though the already admixed group Ahom made up a relatively small portion of the kingdom's population, they maintained their original Ahom language and practised their traditional religion till the 17th century, when the Ahom court as well as the commoners adopted the Assamese language.

History

Origins
The Tai speaking people came into prominence first in the Guangxi region, in China, from where they moved to mainland Southeast Asia in the middle of the 11th century after a long and fierce battle with the Northern Han tribes. The Tai-Ahoms are traced to either Mong Mao of South China or to the Hukawng Valley in Myanmar.

Sukaphaa, a Tai prince of Mong Mao, and a band of followers reached Assam in 1228 with an intention of settling there. They came with a higher technology of wet-rice cultivation then extant and a tradition of writing, record keeping, and state formation.  They settled in the region south of the Brahmaputra river and to the east of the Dikho river; the Ahoms today are found concentrated in this region. Sukaphaa, the leader of the Tai group and his 9,000 followers established the Ahom kingdom (1228–1826 CE), which controlled much of the Bramhaputra valley until 1826.

Initial formation in Assam
In the initial phase, the band of followers of Sukaphaa moved about for nearly thirty years and mixed with the local population. He moved from place to place, searching for a seat. He made peace with the Borahi and Moran ethnic groups, and he and his mostly male followers married into them, creating an admixed population identified as Ahoms and initiating the process of Ahomisation. The Borahis, a Tibeto-Burman people, were completely subsumed into the Ahom fold, though the Moran maintained their independent ethnicity.  Sukaphaa established his capital at Charaideo near present-day Sivasagar in 1253 and began the task of state formation.

Ahomisation
The Ahoms believed that they were divinely ordained to bring fallow land under the plow with their techniques of wet-rice cultivation, and to adopt stateless shifting cultivators into their fold. They were also conscious of their numerical minority. As a result, the Ahom polity initially absorbed Naga, Borahi and Moran, and later large sections of the Chutia and the Dimasa-Kachari peoples. This process of Ahomisation went on until the mid-16th century, when the Ahom society itself came under the direct Hindu influence.  That many indigenous peoples were ceremonially adopted into Ahom clans are recorded in the chronicles.  Since the Ahoms married liberally outside their own exogamous clans and since their own traditional religion resembled the religious practices of the indigenous peoples the assimilation under Ahomisation had little impediment.

Localisation and Loss
In the 16th and 17th centuries, the small Ahom community expanded their rule dramatically toward the west and they successfully saw off challenges from Mughal and other invaders, gaining them recognition in world history.  The rapid expansion resulted in the Ahom people becoming a small minority in their own kingdom, of which they kept control.  Eventually, the Ahom court, as well as the Ahom peasants took to Ekasarana dharma, Shaktism and Saivism over the traditional Ahom religion; and adopted Assamese over the Ahom language for secular purposes. 
The modern Ahom people and their culture are a syncretism of the original Tai and their culture and local Tibeto-Burman peoples and their cultures they absorbed in Assam.

The everyday usage of Ahom language ceased completely by early 19th-century.  The loss of religions is also nearly complete, with only a few priestly families practising some aspects of it.  While the written language (and ritualistic chants) survive in a vast number of written manuscripts, much of the spoken language is lost because the Ahom script does not mark tone and under-specifies vowel contrasts.

Revivalism
Though the first political organisation (All Assam Ahom Association) was created in 1893 it was in 1954 when Ahom connection to other Tai groups in Assam was formally established.

Society

Ban-Mong Social system 
The traditional social system of Tai-Ahom people was known as Ban-Mong  which was related to agriculture and based on irrigation. The Ban or Ban Na is a unit composed of families that settled by the side of the rivers. While many Bans together forms a Mong which refers state.

Ahom clans
Ahom clans, called phoids, formed socio-political entities.  At the time of ingress into Assam, or soon thereafter, there were seven important clans, called Satghariya Ahoms (Ahoms of the Seven Houses).  There were Su/Tsu (Tiger) clan to which the Chao-Pha (Sukaphaa) belonged; his two chief counselors Burhagohain (Chao-Phrung-Mung) and Borgohain (Chao-Thao-Mung); and three priestly clans: Bailung (Mo-plang), Deodhai (Mo-sham), Mohan (Mo-hang) and Siring. Soon the Satghariya group was expanded—four additional clans began to be associated with nobility: Dihingia, Sandikoi, Lahon and Duarah.  In the 16th-century Suhungmung added another great counselor, the Borpatrogohain and a new clan was established.  Over time sub-clans began appearing.  Thus during the Suhungmung's reign, the Chao-Pha's clan were divided into seven sub-clans—Saringiya, Tipamiya, Dihingiya, Samuguriya, Tungkhungiya, Parvatiya, and Namrupiya.  Similarly, Burhagohain clan were divided into eight, Borgohain sixteen, Deodhai twelve, Mohan seven, and Bailung and Siring eight each.   The rest of the 
Ahom gentry belonged to clans such as Chaodangs, Gharphalias, Likchows etc.  In general, the secular aristocratic clans, the priestly class, and the gentry clans did not intermarry.

Some clans admitted people from other ethnic groups as well.  For example, Miri-Sandikoi and Moran-Patar were Sandikoi and Patar from the Mising and Moran communities, while the founders of Chetias and Lahons were from the Chutia community. This was true even for the priestly clans: Naga-Bailung, Miri-Bailung and Nara-Bailung.

Literature
The Ahoms were literate with a writing system based on the Ahom script, which fell into disuse along with the language.  The Ahom script evolved from an earlier script of the Tai Nuea language which developed further under the present Chinese Government. There exists today a large corpus of manuscripts in this script on history, society, astrology, rituals, etc. Ahom people used to write their chronicles known as Buranji. The priestly classes (Mo'sam, Mo'hung, Mo'Plong) are the custodians of these manuscripts.

Calendar
The Ahom people used to use a lunar calendar known as Lak-Ni Tao-Si-Nga with its origins in the middle kingdoms (Chung-Kuo). But is still in vogue in China and South-East Asian Tai people.

Culture

Housing
Like the rural Thai people of Thailand, the house rural Ahom families have been made of wood and bamboo, and two roofs are typically thatched. Families' orchards and ploughed fields are situated near their house. Houses are built in a scattered fashion within bamboo groves. At one time, the Ahom built their house on stilts called Rwan Huan about two meters above ground level.

Culinary traditions
Food is one of the important variables of the culture of Tai-Ahom. Most Ahoms, particularly in rural areas, are non-vegetarian, still maintaining a traditional cuisine similar to other Tai people. Rice is a staple food. Typical dishes are pork, chicken, duck, slices of beef, frogs, many kinds of fishes, hukoti maas (dry preserved fish mixture), muga lota (cocoon seeds of endi and muga worms), and eggs of red ants. Certain insects are also popular foods for the Ahoms. Luk-Lao or Nam-Lao (rice beer, undiluted or diluted) are traditional drinks. They consume "Khar" (a form of alkaline liquid extracted from the ashes of burned banana peels/bark), "Betgaaj" (tender cane shoots), and many other naturally grown herbs with medicinal properties. However beef for the genral hindus and, pork  for the Vaisnavites are avoided  During Siva Singha's reign, the people abandoned the free usage of meat and drinks.

Ahom food specialties resemble Thai cuisine. Like the Thais, the Ahoms prefer boiled food that have little spices and directly burnt fish, meat and vegetables like brinjal, tomato, etc. Some of them are Thu–dam (black lentil), Khao–Moon (Rice Frumenty), Xandohguri (a powder made from dry roasted rice), ChewaKhao (steamed rice), Chunga Chaul (sticky rice cooked in tender bamboo tubes), Til pitha (sesame rice rolls prepared from sticky rice powder), and Khao-tyek (rice flakes). The process of preparation of this item was quite unknown to population other than the Ahoms and the Thais.  Khao (unboiled soft rice prepared from a special variety of sticky rice with a unique technique), Tupula Khao (a kind of rice cooked and packed with a particular kind of plant leaf with good smell called 'tora pat' and preserved bamboo sauce are some of the favourite food items of the Ahoms, which are similar to their traditional diet.

Wedding

Cho Klong is the main marriage ritual among the twenty marriage rituals of Tai Ahom people. The name Cho Klong is derived from the Tai Ahom language [Cho=to combine, klong=ritual]. The ritual is described in an ancient Tai Ahom script Lai Lit nang Hoon Pha. 101 ban-phai-s (earthen lamps) or lights are lit. The bride offers the groom a heng-dan (sword) to protect her, their children, family, race and country. Sum of twenty rituals are performed in ahom wedding along with cho klong, including: 
Ju-ron 
Rik-Khwan
Aap-Tang [Aap=Bath, Tang=devine]
Chow Ban [worshipping sun]
Jon-ming [Blessing given by Moloung priests]

Religion

Most Ahoms today declare Hinduism as their religion, although there is an effort to revive the traditional Ahom religion. The Ahom religion started to decline since the days of Jayadhwaj Singha, he was the first Ahom king to adopt Ekasarana Dharma and to take initiation  of the Auniati Mahanta. From Jayadhawaj Singha to Rantadhwaj Singha  all were followers of Ekasarana Dharma. From Gadadhar Singha onwards the kings veered towards Shaktism.    Siva Singha made the Shaktism  the state religion, Suremphaa Rajeswar Singha (1751–1769) ordered Sanskritisation. All funerals were to be practised under the Hindu cremation rites, conducted by a Maithil Brahmin priest and a traditional priest. Nevertheless, Me-Dam-Me-Phi is widely celebrated.

Language

The Ahoms today use the Assamese language after the traditional language, the Ahom language, fell into complete disuse. The Ahom language, a member of the Tai branch of the Kra–Dai languages is now dead, with its tone system completely lost.  Nevertheless, it is being revived by some Tai Ahom organisations.

Starting in the late 20th and continuing into the early 21st century, there has been renewed interest among the Ahoms in their culture and language leading to increased study and attempts at revival. The 1901 census of India enumerated approximately 179,000 people identifying as Ahom. The latest available census records slightly over 2 million Ahom individuals, however, estimates of the total number of people descended from the original Tai-Ahom settlers are as high as eight million. The Ahom script also finds a place in the Unicode Consortium and the script declared the topmost in the South-East Asia category.

Ahom people today
Ahom people today are categorised in the other backward classes (OBC) caste category; there is longstanding discussion and demand for Scheduled Tribe status. The term "ethnic Assamese" is now associated by the Indian government with the various indigenous Assamese people. According to Anthony Van Nostrand Diller, possibly eight million speakers of Assamese can claim genetic descent from the Ahoms.  However, historian Yasmin Saikia argues that in pre-colonial times, the Ahoms were not an ethnic community, but were a relatively open status group. Any community coming into the socio-economic fold of the Ahom state could claim the Ahom status with active consent of the king.

Notable people
Dip Gogoi
Tarun Gogoi
Ranjan Gogoi
Padmanath Gohain Baruah
Krishna Kanta Handique
Jatindra Nath Duwara
Hiren Gohain
Kushal Konwar
Gomdhar Konwar
Benudhar Rajkhowa
Nagen Saikia
Hiteswar Saikia
Laluksola Borphukan
Homen Borgohain
Lachit Borphukan
Jyoti Prasad Rajkhowa
Lila Gogoi

See also
 Ahom Dynasty
 Ahom history
 All Tai Ahom Students Union
 Assamese people
 Tibeto-Burman and Tai peoples of Assam
 Hengdang

Notes

References

Further reading
 Phukon, G. (1998). State of Tai culture among the Ahoms. [Assam, India?]: G. Phukon.

External links

 
 
 The Tai-Ahom connection by Yasmin Saikia in Gateway to the East, June 2005.
 Polities mentioned in the Chinese Ming Shi-lu, several references are made to a Tai Ahom kingdom in this translation of an important Ming dynasty historical source

Assamese nationalism
Tai history
Tai peoples
Social groups of Assam
Ahom kingdom
Ethnic groups in Northeast India
Tribes of Assam
Ethnic groups in South Asia
Ethnic groups in India